The 2022 Reno mayoral election was held on November 8, 2022, to elect the mayor of Reno, Nevada. Incumbent Hillary Schieve won re-election to a third and final term.

Municipal elections in Nevada are nonpartisan. A blanket primary election was held on June 14, concurrently with the statewide primary elections.

Candidates

Advanced to general
 Eddie Lorton, candidate for mayor in 2014 and 2018
 Hillary Schieve, incumbent mayor

Eliminated in primary
 Jenny Brekhus, city councilor
 Chad Dehne, U.S. Marine Corps veteran, perennial candidate and candidate for mayor in 2010, 2014, and 2018
 Michael Graham
 Matthew Johnson
 William Mantle, family support specialist, candidate for mayor in 2018	
 Jesse O. Razo
 Joaquin R. Roces
 Judi Rought

Primary election

Polling

Results

General election

Results

Notes

References

Reno mayoral
Mayoral elections in Reno, Nevada
Reno